Pierre Renoir (March 21, 1885 – March 11, 1952) was a French stage and film actor. He was the son of the impressionist painter Pierre-Auguste Renoir and elder brother of the film director Jean Renoir. He is also noted for being the first actor to play Georges Simenon's character Inspector Jules Maigret in
Night at the Crossroads, directed by his brother.

Life and career

Pierre Renoir was born on March 21, 1885, in Paris, at 18 rue Houdon, about a hundred meters from place Pigalle, to painter Pierre-Auguste Renoir and Aline Charigot. He was married to actress Véra Sergine from 1914 to 1925.

For his best remembered role, as Jėricho the ragman in Children of Paradise (Les Enfants du Paradis, 1945), he was cast at short notice to replace the collaborator Robert Le Vigan; Jėricho's scenes had to be reshot after Le Vigan fled. Renoir was briefly the director of the Théâtre de l'Athénée in Paris, taking over after the death of Louis Jouvet in 1951. Pierre Renoir's son was the cinematographer Claude Renoir (1913–93)not to be confused with Pierre's brother Claude Renoir, known as 'Coco' (1901–69).

Selected filmography

 La Digue (1911, Short) - Pierre Wallen
 Les deux gosses (1916) - Le lieutenant Jacques d'Alboise
 Marion Delorme (1918) - Le roi Louis XIII
 The Whirlpool of Fate (1925) - Farmer
 Morgane, the Enchantress (1928)
 Night at the Crossroads (1932) - Le commissaire Maigret
 The Agony of the Eagles (1933) - Montander
 Madame Bovary (1934) - Charles Bovary
 La Route impériale (1935) - Maj. Hudson
 Tovaritch (1935) - Gorotchenko
 La Bandera (1935) - Le capitaine Weller
 Veille d'armes (1935) - Le commandant Brambourg
 Under Western Eyes (1936) - Un Policier
 Les loups entre eux (1936) - Gottfried Welter
 Quand minuit sonnera (1936) - Jean Verdier
 De Man Zonder Hart (1937) - Sourdier
 L'Île des veuves (1937) - Ralph Berry
 Boissière (1937) - Le général baron von Hubner
 The Citadel of Silence (1937) - Le colonel-comte Stepan Iporievitch
 Mollenard (1938) - Bonnerot
 La Marseillaise (1938) - Le Roi de France Louis XVI
 Légions d'honneur (1938) - L'avocat Dumas
 Les Nuits blanches de Saint-Pétersbourg (1938) - Ivan Borowsky
 The Lafarge Case (1938) - Charles Lafarge
 The Patriot (1938) - Le comte de Pahlen
 Satan's Paradise (1938) - Paraíso de Satã (1938) - Aristophélès
 La Piste du sud (1938) - Stolberg
 La Maison du Maltais (1938) - L'archéologue André Chervin
 Le révolté (1938) - Capitaine Yorritz
 Serge Panine (1939) - Cayrol
 Coral Reefs (1939) - Abboy
 Nord-Atlantique (1939) - Le capitaine Jeff Cooper
 Personal Column (1939) - Brémontière
 Nadia la femme traquée (1940) - Daminoff
 Ceux du ciel (1941) - Pierron
 L'embuscade (1941) - Jean Guéret
 The Pavilion Burns (1941) - Jourdinsse
 Histoire de rire (1941) - Jules Donaldo
 Macao, l'enfer du jeu (1942) - Werner von Krall (1942 version only)
 La loi du printemps (1942) - Frédéric Villaret
 Le journal tombe à cinq heures (1942) - François Marchal
 The Trump Card (1942) - Rudy Score
 L'appel du bled (1942) - Michaud
 The Wolf of the Malveneurs (1943) - Reginald de Malveneur
 Madame et le mort (1943) - Charles de Bruine
 Tornavara (1943) - Sigurd Framrus
 Traveling Light (1944) - Georges Renaud
 Les Enfants du paradis (1945) - Jéricho
 Father Goriot (1945) - Vautrin
 St. Val's Mystery (1945) - Le docteur Dartignac
 Marie la Misère (1945) - Pierre Desormes
 Resistance (1945) - Le colonel
 Special Mission (1946) - Landberg alias Moravetz - le chef du réseau d'espionnage alleman
 The Captain (1946) - Le duc d'Angoulême
 Coincidences (1947) - Monsieur Bardolas
 Les trafiquants de la mer (1947) - Le prince Boris Mentischev
 Secret Cargo (1947) - Le préfet de police
 La dame d'onze heures (1948) - Le docteur Gérard Pescara
 La grande volière (1948) - Vallette
 Scandal on the Champs-Élysées (1949) - Dominique Airelle
 The Mystery of the Yellow Room (1949) - Professeur Stangerson
 The Farm of Seven Sins (1949) - Le procureur Edmond de Chancey
 The Ferret (1950) - Le docteur Darvel-Juste
 Menace de mort (1950) - Bernier
 Dr. Knock (1951) - Le pharmacien Mousquet
 Judgement of God'' (1952) - Le duc Ernest de Bavière (final film role)

References

External links

1885 births
1952 deaths
Male actors from Paris
French male film actors
French male silent film actors
French male stage actors
Pierre
20th-century French male actors